The National Youth Advocacy Service (NYAS) is a UK children's charity which offers socio-legal advocacy services to children and young people up to the age of 25, parents, carers and associated professionals. NYAS can be appointed by a Court under Family Procedure Rules to represent the child as a Guardian ad Litem in exceptional circumstances.

External links
 Web site

Children's charities based in the United Kingdom
Legal aid
Children's charities